The members of the 1st General Assembly of Newfoundland were elected in the Newfoundland general election held in November 1832, the first general election for the colony. The general assembly sat from January 1, 1833 until 1836.

John Bingley Garland was chosen as speaker. Thomas Bennett replaced Garland as speaker in 1834.

The first session of the general assembly met in a tavern and lodging house in St. John's operated by a Mary Travers; the elected assembly met on the ground floor and the appointed Board of Council met on the upper floor. A different location, the Old Court House, was used for the second and subsequent sessions.

In 1833, the assembly passed a Revenue Bill which would provide much-needed funds to support the operation of the colony. The bill was subsequently rejected by the Legislative Council. The governor and British Government intervened in support of the legislation, which was submitted again and this time approved by the council.

Sir Thomas John Cochrane, although he had been opposed to the concept of representative government in the colony, became its first civil governor and was responsible for the implementation of the new system of government. The governor's support was required on any new legislation and he had the power to prorogue the assembly. Cochrane was removed from office in 1834 and replaced by Sir Henry Prescott.

A Newfoundland general election was held in 1836 but the results were set aside by Chief Justice Henry John Boulton because the writs for the election did not bear the required Great Seal. A new election was called for the following year.

Members of the Assembly 
The following members were elected to the assembly in 1832:

Notes:

By-elections 
By-elections were held to replace members for various reasons:

Notes:

References 

Newfoundland
001